Biomphalaria pfeifferi is a species of air-breathing freshwater snail, an aquatic animal pulmonate gastropod mollusk in the family Planorbidae, the ram's horn snails.

This snail is a medically important pest, because of transferring the disease schistosomiasis.

Distribution 
Biomphalaria pfeifferi is an African species. It has recently expanded its native range.

Distribution of Biomphalaria pfeifferi include:
 Western Africa: Senegal
 Eastern Africa: Kenya

The type locality is Umgani-Valley, Natal, South Africa (in the times of the description it was the British Colony of Natal).

Phylogeny 
A cladogram showing phylogenic relations of species in the genus Biomphalaria:

Ecology 
Biomphalaria pfeifferi can survive up to 16 hours in anaerobic water using lactic acid fermentation.

In Kenya, B. pfeifferi is positively associated with the common blue water-lily Nymphaea caerulea (the two species occur together).

Parasites 
Parasites of Biomphalaria pfeifferi include the following 11 species found in Tanzania:
 Schistosoma mansoni
 undescribed clinostomatid
 two species undescribed strigea
 Cercaria porteri
 Cercaria blukwa
 two species of undescribed echinostome
 Cercaria lileta
 Cercaria obscurior
 Cercaria bulla

Control 
In Kenya, releasing the edible American crayfish Procambarus clarkii as an introduced species has helped eliminate the mollusc, which it feeds on, as well as provided a new source of food and income, but may also be impacting the environment by reducing the amount of native aquatic plants.

The seeds of the tree Balanites aegyptiaca have a molluscicide effect on Biomphalaria pfeifferi.

Ethanolic extract of the fruits of Dalbergia sissoo (family Leguminosae) exhibited molluscicidal effect against eggs of Biomphalaria pfeifferi.

References

Further reading 
 
 
 Wright C. A. (1963). "The freshwater gastropod mollusca of Angola". Bulletin of the British Museum (Natural History) 10(8): 447-528. 16 plates. page 455.

Biomphalaria
Gastropods described in 1848
Taxa named by Christian Ferdinand Friedrich Krauss